USS Pontiac may refer to the following ships of the United States Navy:

 , was a side-wheel gunboat launched in 1863 and sold in 1867
 , was laid down as Right Arm in 1891 and purchased by the US Navy in 1898; sold in 1922
 , was originally Pioneer built in 1883, chartered by the US Navy in 1918 and returned to the owner the same year
 ,  was a refrigerator ship built in 1937, chartered by the US Navy in 1942 and returned to the Maritime Commission in 1945
 , was a large harbor tugboat launched in 1960 and struck from the Naval Vessel Register in 1992

United States Navy ship names